The 1923 King's Birthday Honours in New Zealand, celebrating the official birthday of King George V, were appointments made by the King on the recommendation of the New Zealand government to various orders and honours to reward and highlight good works by New Zealanders. They were announced on 2 June 1923.

The recipients of honours are displayed here as they were styled before their new honour.

Knight Bachelor
 The Honourable Frederick Revans Chapman – judge of the Supreme Court.

Order of the Bath

Companion (CB)
Military division
 Captain (Commodore, 2nd class) Alan Geoffrey Hotham  – Royal Navy. In recognition of valuable services rendered in organising, recruiting, and training for the New Zealand Division of the Royal Navy, and as naval adviser to the New Zealand government.

Order of Saint Michael and Saint George

Companion (CMG)
 Captain Thomas Edward Donne – secretary, office of the high commissioner in London for New Zealand.
 James William Tibbs – lately headmaster of the Auckland Grammar School. In recognition of services to education.

Order of the British Empire

Knight Commander (KBE)
Civil division
 Robert Howard Nolan  – of Auckland. In recognition of his public services.

Officer (OBE)
Civil division
 Frederick William Flanagan – permanent head of the Valuation Department.

References

Birthday Honours
1923 awards
1923 in New Zealand
New Zealand awards